Oakland International Airport  is an international airport in Oakland, California, United States,  south of Downtown Oakland located in the San Francisco Bay Area. It is owned by the Port of Oakland and has domestic passenger flights to cities throughout the United States and international flights to Mexico, Central America and the Azores, in addition to cargo flights to China and Japan. The airport is an operating base for Southwest Airlines, which operates point-to-point routes with bases instead of a traditional network with hubs.

History

Early years
The city of Oakland looked into the construction of an airport starting in 1925. The announcement of the Dole Air Race for a flight from California to Hawaii provided the incentive to purchase  in April 1927 for the airport. The  runway was the longest in the world at the time and was built in just 21 days ahead of the Dole race start. The airport was dedicated by Charles Lindbergh on September 17. In its early days, because of its long runway enabling safe takeoff rolls for fuel-heavy aircraft, Oakland was the departing point of several historic flights, including Charles Kingsford Smith's historic US-Australia flight in 1928 and Amelia Earhart's final flight in 1937. Earhart departed from this airport when she made her final, ill-fated voyage, intending to return there after circumnavigating the globe.

Boeing Air Transport (a predecessor of United Airlines) began scheduled flights to Oakland in December 1927. It was joined by Trans World Airlines (TWA) in 1932. In 1929 Boeing opened the Boeing School of Aeronautics on the field, which expanded rapidly in 1939 as part of the Civilian Pilot Training Program. Thousands of pilots and mechanics were trained before the facility was changed into the United Air Lines training center in 1945.

In 1943 the U.S. Armed Forces temporarily took over Oakland Airport and opened Naval Air Station Oakland. It was transformed into an airlift base for military flights to the Pacific islands, ordering all scheduled services to move to San Francisco International Airport. After the war, airlines slowly returned to Oakland; Western Airlines began flights in 1946, and was followed by American Airlines, TWA, United, Transocean Air Lines and Pacific Southwest Airlines (PSA). Oakland became a larger center for non-scheduled and supplemental air carriers: The four largest such companies were based and headquartered in Oakland: Transocean Air Lines, World Airways, Trans International Airlines and Saturn Airways. Oakland became one of the largest overhaul and maintenance operations in the country when Aircraft Engine and Maintenance Company (AEMCO) processed thousands of aircraft. 
 
The airport's first Jet Age terminal (now Terminal 1) was designed by John Carl Warnecke & Associates and opened in 1962, part of a $20 million expansion on bay fill that included the 10,000-foot (3048 m) runway 11/29 (now 12/30). The May 1963 OAG showed 15 airline flights arriving in Oakland each day, including nine from San Francisco; in June 1963, TWA flew Oakland's first scheduled jet, a Convair 880, to Chicago. American Airlines scheduled service from Oakland to Phoenix then into Dallas using the Boeing 720 aircraft. Pacific Southwest Airlines (PSA) provided several flights within California from OAK using Boeing 727 and DC-9 aircraft. United Airlines introduced non-stop service to Chicago, and on the San Francisco-Oakland-Los Angeles route using the Boeing 727.

During the Vietnam War, World Airways shuttled thousands of military passengers through Oakland to their bases in Southeast Asia, and an international arrivals facility was built, allowing the airport to handle international flights for the first time. World Airways had broken ground on the World Airways Maintenance Center at Oakland International Airport. The maintenance hangar could store four Boeing 747s. It opened in May 1973. During its operation, World Airways provided contract maintenance services for 14 airlines in the facility. By 1988, World Airways vacated the Oakland maintenance base and moved its headquarters to Washington Dulles. That same year, United Airlines assumed the lease on the maintenance base.

After the war, Oakland's traffic slumped, but airline deregulation prompted several low-fare carriers to begin flights. This increase prompted the airport to build a $16.3 million second terminal, the Lionel J. Wilson Terminal 2, with seven gates for PSA and AirCal service. In the mid-1980s, People Express Airlines provided scheduled Boeing 747 transcontinental flights from OAK to Newark. SFO Helicopter Airlines served scheduled passenger flights between SFO and the Oakland Convention Center from OAK for many years until 1985. In 1987, British Airways and Air France Concorde visited Oakland to provide supersonic two-hour flights to the Pacific halfway to Hawaii and back to Oakland. Additionally, Concorde returned for a special around-the-world trip covering 38,215 miles over a three-week tour in March 1989.

FedEx Express opened a air cargo base at OAK in 1988, which is now one of the busiest air freight terminals in the United States. In the 1990s, Southwest Airlines opened a crew base in Oakland, and expanded its flights to become the airport's dominant passenger carrier. The airport has international arrival facilities, including U.S. Customs and Border Protection office. The 1990s saw a rise of low-cost carriers serving Oakland, Morris Air (later merged into Southwest Airlines), and MarkAir to name a few, provided several domestic destinations from OAK. During the 1990s, tour operator SunTrips contracted Aerocancun and Leisure Air to provide scheduled charter flights from OAK to sun destinations during the early 1990s. TAESA and Mexicana Airlines also flew between Oakland and cities in Mexico for many years. In the past Tower Air and Corsairfly flew Orly Airport to OAK to Papeete, Tahiti, Martinair flew to Schiphol Airport and CityBird flew to Brussels Airport in Brussels.

2000s

United Airlines vacated its  Oakland Maintenance Center in May 2003 and transferred work to its base across the bay at San Francisco International Airport (SFO).

Oakland International Airport began a $300 million expansion and renovation project in 2004, including adding five gates in Terminal 2. The new concourse partially opened in fall 2006, was fully opened by spring 2007, and a new baggage claim in Terminal 2 opened in summer 2006. The former Terminal 2 baggage claim has been replaced by a renovated and expanded security screening area. As part of this program, airport roadways, curbsides and parking lots were also renovated by the end of 2008.

In 2008 Oakland saw a series of cutbacks due to high fuel costs and airline bankruptcies, more than other Bay Area airports. In just a few days, Oakland's numerous non-stops to Hawaii were eliminated following the liquidation of ATA Airlines and Aloha Airlines, although Hawaiian Airlines started a daily flight to Honolulu a month later. Skybus Airlines stopped flying to Columbus, OH when it ended operations on April 5. American Airlines and Continental Airlines both dropped Oakland on September 3, United Airlines ended service to Los Angeles on November 2.

2010s

Following the years of the Great Recession, during which a few airlines were either liquidated (ATA Airlines and Aloha Airlines), or consolidated business to San Francisco International Airport, OAK started a gradual recovery, which has continued through 2017.

In 2009 Allegiant Air moved operations from San Francisco International Airport, before designating OAK as a focus city. After the bankruptcies of ATA and Aloha Airlines, Alaska Airlines and Hawaiian Airlines replaced their nonstop services to Hawaii. In the same year, Volaris began service to OAK as their first destination in the San Francisco Bay Area and held a commercial agreement with Southwest Airlines, until its merger with AirTran Airways in 2011. Malaysia-based AirAsia X honored its new partners, the Oakland Raiders of the National Football League (NFL). AirAsia X had one of their planes full of its executives and crew members "touch down" at OAK in acknowledgment of the to-be announced sponsorship. AirAsia executives had new optimism that service between the U.S. and the airline's main base in Kuala Lumpur, could possibly happen earlier than originally expected, but has yet to come to fruition as of 2020.

In 2009 OAK had the highest on-time arrival percentage among the 40 busiest North American airports.

In 2011 Spirit Airlines returned to OAK after several years of absence, eventually flying a combined total of seven year-round and seasonal routes by the summer of 2017. Oakland International Airport also celebrated its 85th Anniversary in 2011, commemorating the first transpacific crossing by air from OAK to Hawaii, which took place on June 29, 1927, in The Bird of Paradise, flown by Hegenberger and Maitland. In 2012 United Airlines pulled out of OAK, consolidating operations at San Francisco International Airport, its Bay Area hub. Arkefly (which later re-branded as TUI Airlines Netherlands) chose OAK as a San Francisco Bay Area gateway, flying twice-weekly to Amsterdam, via a stop at Los Angeles International Airport. Arkefly provided 18 weeks of scheduled service in the summer of 2012. The airline followed with a similar schedule during the summer of in 2013, before discontinuing service at OAK.

In 2013 FedEx Express opened a $30 million upgrade of its hub facility at OAK, including additions to accommodate the airline's new Boeing 777 Freighter fleet. In 2014, Norwegian Air Shuttle announced its first two year-round flights to Stockholm and Oslo airport, using Boeing 787-8 aircraft seating 291 passengers operated by Norwegian Long Haul. The flights were the first-ever nonstop services offered from the two Scandinavian capitals to the San Francisco Bay Area, providing several connections throughout Europe. The Oslo flight was later changed to a seasonal schedule.

A long-proposed extension of the BART system to the airport opened on November 22, 2014, allowing passengers to board BART people mover trains and transport from the BART Coliseum station platform to the entrance of all terminals. The new system consists of a mostly elevated structure, running the length of Hegenberger Road.

In May 2015 Oakland International Airport's Moving Modern program construction commenced a $100 million renovation of the Terminal 1 complex. The project included seismic architectural retrofits in central buildings, replacement and upgrading of infrastructure and improvement of the passenger environment. The project was completed in Spring 2017.

In 2016 Norwegian Air Shuttle announced nonstop flights connecting Oakland with London beginning the following spring. British Airways responded with their own service to London, with both airlines providing service to London's Gatwick Airport. American Airlines also returned and re-branded, following a merger with US Airways; the latter previously having a short-term presence at OAK, following a separate merger with America West Airlines during the previous decade. Southwest Airlines inaugurated nonstop flights from Oakland to Mexico for the airline's first international nonstop flights from OAK. The additional routes also gave the airline a combined total of 30 year-round and seasonal flights at the airport as of early 2017.

In 2017 Norwegian Air Shuttle announced nonstop flights connecting Oakland with Copenhagen on a seasonal basis from March 28, and Oakland with Barcelona from June 7 to operate year-round. Level, a new carrier owned by IAG, responded with their own Barcelona service, started flights initially operated by IAG partner Iberia on June 2, with both airlines providing service to Barcelona El Prat Airport. In the months following, Norwegian announced in May the introduction of nonstop flights between Oakland and Rome Fiumicino started on February 6, 2018, and in July the introduction of nonstop flights between Oakland and Paris Charles de Gaulle began on April 10, 2018.

Recent years 
Between mid-2018 through early 2020, OAK had both lost and was losing domestic and international nonstop routes; the indefinite grounding of the Boeing 737 MAX by both Southwest and American, the "restructuring" of schedules by airlines, and a lack of demand all contribute to this. British Airways ended service in October 2018. Level moved its operations to SFO, as did Norwegian Air Shuttle for its seven routes serving OAK. Southwest Airlines ended systemwide service with Newark Liberty International Airport in November 2019, followed by discontinuing three more routes with OAK effective January 2020. Three other routes are currently suspended by Southwest until further notice, while American did the same during summer 2019 for service with Dallas/Fort Worth International Airport. Due to the COVID-19 pandemic, JetBlue withdrew operations from OAK in April 2020 while American Airlines withdrew in early June 2020.

In December 2022 Volaris El Salvador announced nonstop flights connecting Oakland with San Salvador beginning the following spring of 2023.

Future developments 
Despite these recent challenges, the Port of Oakland is eyeing a major expansion to consolidate and modernize existing terminals while creating a third passenger terminal. This project is in the early stages of planning, with a draft environmental report not expected to be released until 2023. The Oakland airport handled 13.38 million passengers in 2019, but is projecting passenger numbers to reach 15 million by 2023, 20 million by 2028, and 25 million by 2035. Terminals 1 and 2 will be condensed into a single terminal, with shared ticketing, baggage handling, and security. Additionally, customs facilities will be expanded to accommodate additional international flights. A connector will connect the consolidated terminal with the new terminal. Current plans call for a net of 17 gates to be added (unclear if any gates will be added or removed from existing terminals), with construction commencing in 2025. As part of the project, OAK plans to reconfigure cargo facilities and improve roadways, parking, and other support facilities.

Facilities

Terminals
Oakland International Airport has two terminals with a total of 32 gates. The terminals are connected at post-security and gate areas, enabling arriving passengers to go straight to their connecting flights without having to re-enter the security check. All non pre-cleared international flights are processed in Terminal 1.

Terminal 1 contains 18 gates. (Alaska, Allegiant, Azores, Contour, Delta, Frontier, Hawaiian, Southwest, Spirit, Volaris, Volaris El Salvador)
Terminal 2 contains 14 gates. (Southwest)
JSX is housed in a facility separate from the main passenger terminals.

Runways
Oakland International Airport has four runways. Changes to Earth's magnetic field required runways 27 and 29 to be renamed 28 and 30 in 2013.
 South Field (commercial and cargo operations):
 Runway 12/30:  asphalt
 North Field (general aviation operations):
 Runway 10R/28L:  asphalt
 Runway 10L/28R:  asphalt
 Runway 15/33:  asphalt
A taxiway that connects the north and south runways passes over Ron Cowan Parkway, forming an aircraft bridge.

General aviation
Signature Flight Support is the primary fixed-base operator (FBO) at Oakland International Airport. Before BBA Aviation acquired Landmark Aviation, the FBO at OAK was the first in the Bay Area and the twelfth location added to Landmark's network in 2011. The FBO is centrally located at OAK's North Field in the Hangar 5 facility. Landmark has initiated a multimillion-dollar renovation project, having already upgraded the FBO terminal along with beginning hangar and property improvements. KaiserAir also provides FBO services at Oakland's North Field, performing maintenance on Gulfstream, Hawker, Cessna and other business jet aircraft. KaiserAir operates Kona Shuttle with flights to Hawaii and charter business jets.

Ground transportation

The airport can be reached by exiting Hegenberger Road or 98th Avenue heading west; both streets converge into Airport Road before looping around in front of the terminals. Doolittle Drive (State Route 61) crosses both Hegenberger Road and 98th Avenue just to the east of where they converge into Airport Road, providing access to the city of Alameda.

Bay Area Rapid Transit (BART) serves the airport via Oakland International Airport station. The station is served by the Beige Line, an automated guideway transit (AGT) route that connects the airport with Coliseum station. The AGT vehicles depart from the airport and Coliseum station every five minutes during daily peak hours and are designed to transport travelers to and from the airport in about eight minutes with an on-time performance of more than 99 percent. A fare surcharge is added for trips to or from Oakland International Airport. The Oakland Airport Connector Project is largely attributable to the work of former BART director and port commissioner Carole Ward Allen who was responsible for securing local, state, and federal funding for the project. Ward Allen advocated for its approval before several transportation authorities endorsed the project, which created between 2,500 and 5,200 direct and indirect jobs.  Some critics of the project argued that the money would be better spent on supporting existing local transit agencies, which had financial issues at the time.

There are three AC Transit routes that serve Oakland Airport, one route runs during the daytime and early evenings, one route runs at all times, and the last route runs overnights as a part of the Bay Area's All Nighter bus network: 
 Route 21 provides daytime and early evening service from the airport to the Dimond District via Bay Farm Island, Alameda, and Fruitvale, making a limited connection with the Alameda Harbor Bay Ferry at Bay Farm Island, and a full-time connection with BART at Fruitvale station.
 Route 73 provides 24/7 service from the airport to the Eastmont Transit Center via Hegenberger Road and 73rd Avenue, connecting with Amtrak's Capitol Corridor service and BART at Oakland Coliseum station. This route provides a cheaper alternative to BART's Coliseum–Oakland International Airport line.
 Route 805 is an All Nighter service from the airport to the Uptown Transit Center in Downtown Oakland. Route 805 supplements Route 73 service to the Eastmont Transit Center before traveling north on MacArthur Boulevard and Grand Avenue to the Uptown Transit Center, making a limited connection with Amtrak's Capitol Corridor service at Oakland Coliseum station, and additional limited connections with BART at Oakland Coliseum station and 19th Street Oakland station.

Sonoma County Airport Express additionally provides airport bus service between the airport and Marin County, Sonoma County, and the Charles M. Schulz–Sonoma County Airport.

Airlines and destinations

Passenger

Destinations map

Cargo

Statistics

Top destinations

Airline market share

Annual traffic

Accidents at or near OAK
April 27, 1943: A US Navy Douglas DC-3  crashed in the hills near the Lake Chabot Golf Course, about 4 miles east of Oakland during approach. Eight of the 10 occupants were killed.
January 18, 1944: A USAAF Douglas C-47 attempted to return to Oakland Municipal Airport because of the failure of the No. 1 engine. It stalled and crashed into a house. All eight occupants died.
February 13, 1945: A US Navy Douglas DC-3 crashed into the Bay one mile from Naval Air Station Oakland 13 minutes after takeoff due to engine failure; all 24 occupants died.
January 20, 1947: A US Navy Douglas DC-4  struck an embankment while on a radar-guided approach to Oakland Airport. A fire broke out. 20 of the 21 occupants got out safely, and one died.
August 24, 1951: United Airlines Flight 615, a Douglas DC-6B impacted mountainous terrain 15 miles southeast of OAK during approach because of the failure of the captain to adhere to instrument procedures. All six crew and 44 passengers died.
November 17, 1951: An Overseas National Airways (ONA) Douglas C-54, a training flight, collided with another C-54 at Oakland Range. The ONA aircraft crashed on a highway, and the other C-54 made an emergency landing at San Francisco International Airport. All three occupants died, and 11 people on the ground were injured.
April 20, 1953: Western Airlines Flight 636, a Douglas DC-6B, crashed into the bay on approach to OAK after departing San Francisco Int'l Airport. Eight of the 10 occupants (four crew, four passengers) were killed.
February 5, 1959: A USAF Fairchild C-119 Flying Boxcar crashed and burned on a test flight, 1.5 miles south of Oakland Int'l Airport. All three occupants died.
January 12, 1995: A West Air Cessna 208 Caravan, a cargo flight, impacted terrain 4 miles west of Pleasanton, California, 14 miles from OAK during the approach. The sole occupant, the pilot, was killed.

See also

 List of airports in the San Francisco Bay Area
 List of airports in California
 California World War II Army Airfields

References

External links

 
Buildings and structures in Oakland, California
Transportation in Oakland, California
Airports in Alameda County, California
Economy of the San Francisco Bay Area
Closed installations of the United States Navy